Post-amendment to the Tamil Nadu Entertainments Tax Act 1939 on 1 April 1958, Gross jumped to 140 per cent of Nett  Commercial Taxes Department disclosed 45 crore in entertainment tax revenue for the year.

The following is a list of films produced in the Tamil film industry in India in 1984, in alphabetical order.

References

1984
Films, Tamil
Lists of 1984 films by country or language
1980s Tamil-language films